The Powell House is an historic U.S. home located in Yakima, Washington at 207 South 9th Street.

Overview
Built in 1895, the Victorian era Powell House is a one-story, wood-frame residence built in the Queen Anne style. It was built on farm property on the east edge of the City but is now fully within the city proper.

See also
 Historic preservation

References

Houses on the National Register of Historic Places in Washington (state)
Queen Anne architecture in Washington (state)
Houses completed in 1895
Buildings and structures in Yakima, Washington
National Register of Historic Places in Yakima County, Washington
Houses in Yakima County, Washington